The Attack on Nibeiwa took place on 9 December 1940 near Nibeiwa, Egypt, when the Italian fortified camp held by the Maletti Group, the armoured force of the 10th Army, was overrun by British and Indian troops. The attack was the opening engagement of Operation Compass a British raid which, if successful, would be followed up to try to expel the Italians from Egypt.

The British probed the Italian defences continually and then planned a five-day raid on the Italian camps, which had been built in an arc from the coast at Maktila to Sofafi in the south-west on the inland escarpment. The British intended to advance into the Nibeiwa–Rabia gap and attack Nibeiwa from the west and if this attack succeeded, move on to attack the camps at Tummar West and Tummar East. The tanks of the 7th Armoured Division would form a defensive screen to the west to intercept a counter-attack and to protect the flank of the 4th Indian Infantry Division as it attacked the camps.

The British and Indian infantry rehearsed an attack with the tanks of the 7th Royal Tank Regiment in late November and another rehearsal was announced for early December, which was actually the attack. On the night of 9/10 December the attack began with diversions on the east side as the main force closed up from the west. The real attack took the Italians by surprise, destroyed the 28 tanks before their crews could react and then broke into the camp. The Italian and Libyan garrison resisted the attack with great determination but were systematically overrun by a combination of tanks, artillery firing from point-blank range and infantry. The Italian and Libyan troops suffered 4,157 casualties for a British loss of 56 men killed and 27 tanks disabled or broken down. The success at Nibeiwa began the collapse of the Italian position in Egypt.

Background

Italian invasion of Egypt

The Italian invasion of Egypt  by the Italian 10th Army began against the Western Desert Force on 13 September 1940, after several days of operations on the Italian side of the border to push back British troops. The original goal of the offensive had been an advance by the 10th Army from Italian Libya along the Egyptian coast to the Suez Canal. Two divisions of the 10th Army advanced and met screening forces of the 7th Support Group (7th Armoured Division) which fell back slowly from Sollum. Once the road was built and supplies had been accumulated, an advance on Mersa Matruh, about  further east was to begin. Blackshirt divisions held Sidi Barrani and Sollum; a metropolitan division garrisoned Buq Buq. Italian engineers worked on a new road from Fort Capuzzo through Sollum to Buq Buq, close to Sidi Barrani and a water pipe from Bardia.

Western Desert Force

The British had some fast Cruiser Mk I, Cruiser Mk II and Cruiser Mk III tanks with 2-pounder guns, which were superior to Italian M11/39 tanks. The British also had a battalion Matilda II infantry tanks that, while slow, carried the 2-pounder and armour that was impervious to Italian anti-tank guns and field guns.

Maletti Group

The I Medium Tank Battalion (Major Victor Ceva) and the II Medium Tank Battalion (Major Eugenio Campanile) and their M11/39 tanks of the 32nd Tank Infantry Regiment in Italy had landed in Libya on 8 July 1940 and transferred to the command of the 4th Tank Infantry Regiment. The medium tanks reinforced the  already in Libya. The Maletti Group/ (General Pietro Maletti) was formed at Derna the same day, with seven Libyan motorised infantry battalions, a company of M11/39 tanks, a company of L3/33 tankettes, motorised artillery and supply units as the main motorised unit of the 10th Army and the first combined arms unit in North Africa.

Prelude

Nibeiwa

The 10th Army began to prepare an advance to Mersa Matruh for 16 December. Only the IX Light Tank Battalion with L3/33 tankettes attached to the 2nd Libyan Division "Pescatori", the II Medium Tank Battalion with M11/39s, with the Maletti Group at Nibeiwa camp and the LXIII and XX Light Tank battalions, with the XXI Corps HQ, were still in Egypt. The five fortified camps from the coast to the escarpment were well defended, but too far apart for overlapping fields of fire, and the defenders were reliant on ground and air patrols to link the camps and watch the British. Italian air reconnaissance spotted British vehicle movements in the area, but Maletti was apparently not informed. On 8 December, Maletti alerted the nearby 2nd Libyan Division "Pescatori" that unusual low-level flying by the RAF was probably intended disguise the movement of armoured units. At  on 9 December, Maletti contacted the commanders of the 1st Libyan Division and 2nd Libyan Division, reporting British preparatory movements.

British plan

Training Exercise No.1 was held from 25 to 26 November near Matruh, on a model marked to resemble the Italian camps at Nibeiwa and the Tummars, and the troops were told that another rehearsal would be run in early December. The exercise was useful in providing experience in night moves under moonlight and attack tactics against a defensive position in the desert. A Method of Attack on an entrenched Camp in the Desert was distributed to units ready for Training Exercise No.2.

The 7th Armoured Division and the 4th Indian Division were reinforced with the British 16th Infantry Brigade, the 7th RTR and the Matruh Garrison Force of a Coldstream Guards battalion and a battery of field artillery; the 7th Indian Brigade was to act as a reserve and protect the lines of communication. Guarded by the Support Group, the rest of 7th Armoured Division and the 4th Indian Division were to drive between Nibeiwa and the Sofafi camps and then attack Nibeiwa from the west with the 11th Indian Infantry Brigade (Colonel Reginald Savory) and 47 Matilda II tanks of the 7th RTR. The cruiser tanks of the 7th Armoured Division were to prevent a counter-attack from Sofafi and cover the left flank of the 4th Indian Division. Once Nibewa had been captured, the attackers would move on to the Tummars. If the attack succeeded, the 7th Armoured Division tanks were to drive north to cut off the Italian line of retreat from Sidi Barrani while the Indians captured the other camps near the port. Maktila was to be cut off by the Matruh Garrison Force, and the tanks were to drive for Buq Buq to cut off the retreat of the garrison to Sollum.

On the night of 6/7 December, the 4th Indian Division left camp for Training Exercise No.2 in a cold wind that raised dust and concealed the lorries of the 4th and 6th New Zealand Reserve Mechanical Transport companies as they drove spread out over the desert, in air formation (no lorry to be within  of another). The troops rested on 7 December, unseen by Italian air reconnaissance, and were told that the attack was the real one that evening. The third battalion drove about  short of the east side of the camp, which was on a flat plateau with a shallow valley on that side.

Battle

British aircraft bombed the camps and flew overhead all night, to disguise the sound of the ground force vehicles and to keep Italian aircraft grounded. At  after the Indians had advanced on foot to the perimeter, they came upon listening posts and commenced firing, at which the Italian garrison sent up flares and returned fire. When the garrison ceased firing, the Indians shifted position and fired again, Under cover of the noise on the east side of Nibeiwa, the British tanks and lorries drove round the west side of the camp, and at  the Indians on the east side retired. A bombardment by British artillery began from the east, to mislead the Italians. The Italians had concentrated their 28 M11/39 tanks beyond the perimeter wall, where the tank crews were caught while warming engines.

The Italian tank crews had no time to react before their tanks were knocked out. The British tanks broke down the walls and drove into the camp, where the Italians had just breakfasted; Maletti advanced with a machine-gun and was killed by a gunshot wound. The Italian and Libyan artillerymen stood by their guns but found that even field artillery shells fired at  range were ineffective against the armour of the Matilda tanks. The Italian and Libyan infantry fought on and isolated parties stalked British tanks with hand grenades but the British methodically occupied the camp, tanks artillery and infantry co-operating to reduce isolated pockets of resistance. By  the last Italian resistance was overcome and large amounts of supplies and water were discovered intact.

Aftermath

Analysis

Australian war correspondent Alan Moorehead visited Nibeiwa after the battle. To reach it, he had to move around destroyed lorries and Bren Carriers that had run onto mines, and past square holes in the ground which had been dug for machine-gun posts. Dead lay around the fort; derelict light tanks were at the west wall, where the Maletti Group had made its last stand. Other tanks were inside the camp facing in all directions. The capture of Nibeiwa camp cleared the way for the next stage of the British attack, when the remaining operational tanks and the 5th Indian Infantry Brigade moved west of the Tummar camps and the 16th Infantry Brigade closed up to the area vacated by the Indian brigade. The Western Desert Force completed the capture of the camps and captured Sidi Barrani, destroying two Italian divisions by 10 December, as two more divisions were caught on the Mersa Matruh–Sidi Barrani road and forced to surrender. By the time that Sidi Barrani was captured on 11 December, the WDF bag had increased to 38,300 prisoners, 73 tanks and 422 guns for a loss of 133 men killed, 387 wounded and eight missing. On 28 December, planning with photographs from reconnaissance aircraft and night patrol reports began for the capture of Bardia, which would not have the benefit of surprise as the attack on Nibeiwa did, as it had far less extensive defences and was too far from neighbouring camps to be supported. The defences of Bardia were reminiscent of the defensive structures used in the First World War, and British artillery would be much more important than it had been at Nibeiwa. The experience of the attack there was important for the plan to use a combination of shock, firepower, tanks and the mobility of the Infantry tanks to break into the port defences.

Casualties

Subsequent operations

The attack on Tummar West began at  after the 7th RTR had refuelled and artillery had bombarded the defences for an hour. Another approach from the north-west was made, the tanks broke through the perimeter and were followed twenty minutes later by the infantry. The defenders held out for longer than the Nibeiwa garrison but by  Tummar West was overrun except for the north-eastern corner. The tanks moved on to Tummar East, the greater part of which was captured by nightfall. The 4th Armoured Brigade had advanced to Azziziya, where the garrison of  surrendered, light patrols of the 7th Hussars pushed forward to cut the road from Sidi Barrani to Buq Buq, while armoured cars of the 11th Hussars ranged further west. The 7th Armoured Brigade were held in reserve ready to intercept an Italian counter-attack. The 2nd Libyan Division lost  and  killed,  and  wounded, with the survivors being taken prisoner.

See also 
 List of British military equipment of World War II
 List of Italian military equipment in World War II

References

Bibliography

Books
 
 
 
 
 
 
 
 
 
 

Theses
 

Conflicts in 1940
1940 in Egypt
Western Desert campaign
Nibeiwa
Battles of World War II involving Italy
December 1940 events
Matrouh Governorate